Diego Alejandro Cuadros Velásquez (born 28 May 1996) is a Colombian footballer who currently plays as a midfielder for Alianza Petrolera.

Club career

FK Senica
Diego Cuadros made his professional Fortuna Liga debut for Senica against Spartak Trnava on February 24, 2018.

After his loan spell at Senica, Cuadros joined the club permanently. But he was released at the end of 2018.

AEZ Zakakiou
On 31 January 2019, the Cyprus Football Association confirmed, that Cuadros had joined AEZ Zakakiou in the Cypriot Second Division.

Alianza Petrolera
In the summer 2019, Cuadros returned to Colombia and signed with Alianza Petrolera.

References

External links
 Futbalnet profile
 
 Diego Cuadros at CFA

1996 births
Living people
Sportspeople from Antioquia Department
Colombian footballers
Colombian expatriate footballers
Association football midfielders
Caracas FC players
Jaguares de Córdoba footballers
FK Senica players
AEZ Zakakiou players
Alianza Petrolera players
Categoría Primera A players
Slovak Super Liga players
Cypriot Second Division players
Expatriate footballers in Slovakia
Expatriate footballers in Cyprus
Colombian expatriate sportspeople in Slovakia
Colombian expatriate sportspeople in Cyprus